Ukraine has submitted films for the Academy Award for Best International Feature Film since 1997. The award is handed out annually by the United States Academy of Motion Picture Arts and Sciences to a feature-length motion picture produced outside the United States that contains primarily non-English dialogue. , fourteen films have been selected to represent Ukraine in this category, and five were accepted and screened by AMPAS. The sixth film, A Driver for Vera was disqualified for having insufficient Ukrainian origins.

Submissions
The Academy of Motion Picture Arts and Sciences has invited the film industries of various countries to submit their best film for the Academy Award for Best Foreign Language Film since 1956. The Foreign Language Film Award Committee oversees the process and reviews all the submitted films. Following this, they vote via secret ballot to determine the five nominees for the award. Below is a list of the films that have been submitted by Ukraine for review by the Academy for the award by year and the respective Academy Awards ceremony.

Additionally, a Ukrainian film, Wartime Romance, was selected by the Soviet Union in 1984.

The Ukrainians have had a shaky record in this category:

 In 2004, A Driver for Vera was disqualified for being a majority-Russian production. The film was largely shot in Ukraine, and was a co-production between Russian and Ukrainian production companies, but the film was made in Russian by a Russian writer-director (Pavlo Chukhrai, who represented Russia in this category and won an Oscar nomination in 1997) and five of the six top-billed actors were Russian.
 In 2006, a Columbia University film professor alleged that Ukraine's selection process was opaque, and that cancer drama Aurora had never actually screened in accordance with AMPAS rules. Despite the protest, Aurora was accepted and screened. 
 In 2007, it was rumored that Ukraine would finally form a special Oscar committee to annually choose a Ukrainian nominee and that supposedly the movie "Koroliova" would be selected in 2007 as Ukraine's Oscar representative. However, eventually it was revealed that the committee did not meet to choose a nominee.
 In 2014, Ukraine's decision to submit Oles Sanin's The Guide ahead of the more acclaimed festival hit The Tribe by Myroslav Slaboshpytskiy, sparked a controversy that resulted in accusations of collusion by several members of the country's selection committee, who were forced to step down. 
 In 2015, Ukraine missed the deadline to submit a film. They requested an extension from the Academy but it was denied.

Black comedy Friend of the Deceased (in Russian), surreal romance Mamay (in Ukrainian), and political thriller-cum-fantasy Illusion of Fear (in Russian) all represented the country without incident.

Shortlisted finalists
In 2020, The Earth Is Blue as an Orange by Iryna Tsilyk and My Thoughts Are Silent by Antonio Lukich were also shortlisted for consideration.

See also
List of Academy Award winners and nominees for Best Foreign Language Film
List of Academy Award-winning foreign language films
List of Soviet submissions for the Academy Award for Best International Feature Film

Notes

References

External links
The Official Academy Awards Database
The Motion Picture Credits Database
IMDb Academy Awards Page

Ukraine
Academy Award